Rana Mansour (born November 16, 1981 in Alexandria, Virginia, United States) is an Iranian-American musician and singer.

Early life 
She attended the Berklee College of Music in Boston, Massachusetts, where she received her Bachelor's in Music with Honors. She released her debut album entitled Suite 16 in 1997 and her first Persian album in September 2015.

TV presence 
 Mansour has also been seen on the hit Bravo show, The Real Housewives of Beverly Hills, performing her original song, "No Place Like Home".

 On November 4, 2022, Mansour performed her version of the song Baraye on the finale of The Voice of Germany to show solidarity with the Iranian protesters. She received a standing ovation of nearly 2 minutes after which she spoke about the political arrest of the Iranian rapper Toomaj Salehi in Iran.

Discography

Studio albums
Suite 16 1997
The Adventures of Indygyrl 2008
Rana Mansour 2015 (self-titled album)
Eshghe Naab 2019

Singles
 "No Place Like Home"
 "Sorry Baby"

References

External links

1981 births
Living people
American singers
American pianists
Iranian musicians
Iranian songwriters
Iranian women singers
21st-century pianists
American jazz singers
21st-century composers
American women singers
Persian-language singers
Iranian women pop singers
American women pop singers
Iranian singer-songwriters
American women jazz singers
21st-century American women
21st-century American singers
21st-century American pianists
Berklee College of Music alumni
Iranian people of American descent